The Lepidoptera of Malta consist of both the butterflies and moths recorded from the island of Malta.

Butterflies

Hesperiidae
Gegenes pumilio (Hoffmannsegg, 1804)

Lycaenidae
Aricia agestis (Denis & Schiffermuller, 1775)
Callophrys rubi (Linnaeus, 1758)
Celastrina argiolus (Linnaeus, 1758)
Lampides boeticus (Linnaeus, 1767)
Leptotes pirithous (Linnaeus, 1767)
Lycaena phlaeas (Linnaeus, 1761)
Lysandra bellargus (Rottemburg, 1775)
Plebejus argus (Linnaeus, 1758)
Polyommatus icarus (Rottemburg, 1775)
Zizeeria knysna (Trimen, 1862)

Nymphalidae
Aglais io (Linnaeus, 1758)
Aglais urticae (Linnaeus, 1758)
Boloria dia (Linnaeus, 1767)
Coenonympha pamphilus (Linnaeus, 1758)
Danaus chrysippus (Linnaeus, 1758)
Hipparchia blachieri (Fruhstorfer, 1908)
Lasiommata maera (Linnaeus, 1758)
Lasiommata megera (Linnaeus, 1767)
Maniola jurtina (Linnaeus, 1758)
Melitaea cinxia (Linnaeus, 1758)
Melitaea didyma (Esper, 1778)
Nymphalis polychloros (Linnaeus, 1758)
Pararge aegeria (Linnaeus, 1758)
Polygonia c-album (Linnaeus, 1758)
Polygonia egea (Cramer, 1775)
Pyronia tithonus (Linnaeus, 1767)
Vanessa atalanta (Linnaeus, 1758)
Vanessa cardui (Linnaeus, 1758)

Papilionidae
Iphiclides podalirius (Linnaeus, 1758)
Iphiclides podalirius podalirius (Linnaeus, 1758)
Papilio machaon Linnaeus, 1758

Pieridae
Aporia crataegi (Linnaeus, 1758)
Colias croceus (Fourcroy, 1785)
Colias hyale (Linnaeus, 1758)
Euchloe belemia (Esper, 1800)
Gonepteryx cleopatra (Linnaeus, 1767)
Gonepteryx rhamni (Linnaeus, 1758)
Leptidea sinapis (Linnaeus, 1758)
Pieris brassicae (Linnaeus, 1758)
Pieris napi (Linnaeus, 1758)
Pieris rapae (Linnaeus, 1758)

Moths

Adelidae
Nemophora raddaella (Hübner, 1793)

Alucitidae
Alucita grammodactyla Zeller, 1841
Alucita hexadactyla Linnaeus, 1758

Autostichidae
Apatema mediopallidum Walsingham, 1900
Dysspastus lilliput Gozmany, 1996
Holcopogon bubulcellus (Staudinger, 1859)
Holcopogon bubulcellus bubulcellus (Staudinger, 1859)
Oecia oecophila (Staudinger, 1876)
Oegoconia deauratella (Herrich-Schäffer, 1854)
Oegoconia deluccai Amsel, 1952
Pantacordis pallida (Staudinger, 1876)
Symmoca signatella Herrich-Schäffer, 1854

Batrachedridae
Batrachedra parvulipunctella Chretien, 1915

Bedelliidae
Bedellia somnulentella (Zeller, 1847)

Blastobasidae
Blastobasis phycidella (Zeller, 1839)

Choreutidae
Choreutis nemorana (Hübner, 1799)
Tebenna bjerkandrella (Thunberg, 1784)

Coleophoridae
Coleophora binotapennella (Duponchel, 1843)
Coleophora calycotomella Stainton, 1869
Coleophora conyzae Zeller, 1868
Coleophora crepidinella Zeller, 1847
Coleophora jefreniensis Toll, 1954
Coleophora luteolella Staudinger, 1880
Coleophora pyrrhulipennella Zeller, 1839
Coleophora semicinerea Staudinger, 1859
Coleophora versurella Zeller, 1849
Goniodoma limoniella (Stainton, 1884)

Cosmopterigidae
Anatrachyntis badia (Hodges, 1962)
Ascalenia acaciella Chretien, 1915
Ascalenia echidnias (Meyrick, 1891)
Bifascioides leucomelanella (Rebel, 1916)
Coccidiphila gerasimovi Danilevsky, 1950
Coccidiphila ledereriella (Zeller, 1850)
Cosmopterix coryphaea Walsingham, 1908
Cosmopterix pulchrimella Chambers, 1875
Eteobalea intermediella (Riedl, 1966)
Eteobalea serratella (Treitschke, 1833)
Gisilia stereodoxa (Meyrick, 1925)
Pyroderces argyrogrammos (Zeller, 1847)
Pyroderces wolschrijni Koster & Sinev, 2003

Cossidae
Zeuzera pyrina pyrina (Linnaeus, 1761)
Zeuzera pyrina (Linnaeus, 1761)

Crambidae
Achyra nudalis (Hübner, 1796)
Agriphila trabeatellus (Herrich-Schäffer, 1848)
Anania crocealis (Hübner, 1796)
Anania hortulata (Linnaeus, 1758)
Anania lancealis (Denis & Schiffermuller, 1775)
Anania testacealis (Zeller, 1847)
Ancylolomia inornata Staudinger, 1870
Ancylolomia pectinatellus (Zeller, 1847)
Ancylolomia tentaculella (Hübner, 1796)
Ancylolomia tripolitella Rebel, 1909
Antigastra catalaunalis (Duponchel, 1833)
Aporodes floralis (Hübner, 1809)
Arnia nervosalis Guenee, 1849
Cataonia erubescens (Christoph, 1877)
Cornifrons ulceratalis Lederer, 1858
Cynaeda dentalis (Denis & Schiffermuller, 1775)
Diasemiopsis ramburialis (Duponchel, 1834)
Dolicharthria bruguieralis (Duponchel, 1833)
Duponchelia fovealis Zeller, 1847
Euchromius cambridgei (Zeller, 1867)
Euchromius ocellea (Haworth, 1811)
Euclasta varii Popescu-Gorj & Constantinescu, 1973
Eudonia angustea (Curtis, 1827)
Evergestis desertalis (Hübner, 1813)
Evergestis isatidalis (Duponchel, 1833)
Hellula undalis (Fabricius, 1781)
Hodebertia testalis (Fabricius, 1794)
Hydriris ornatalis (Duponchel, 1832)
Hyperlais nemausalis (Duponchel, 1834)
Loxostege sticticalis (Linnaeus, 1761)
Mecyna asinalis (Hübner, 1819)
Metacrambus carectellus (Zeller, 1847)
Metasia corsicalis (Duponchel, 1833)
Nomophila noctuella (Denis & Schiffermuller, 1775)
Nymphula nitidulata (Hufnagel, 1767)
Ostrinia nubilalis (Hübner, 1796)
Palepicorsia ustrinalis (Christoph, 1877)
Palpita vitrealis (Rossi, 1794)
Paracorsia repandalis (Denis & Schiffermuller, 1775)
Pediasia siculellus (Duponchel, 1836)
Pleuroptya ruralis (Scopoli, 1763)
Pyrausta despicata (Scopoli, 1763)
Pyrausta sanguinalis (Linnaeus, 1767)
Spoladea recurvalis (Fabricius, 1775)
Tegostoma comparalis (Hübner, 1796)
Udea ferrugalis (Hübner, 1796)
Udea lutealis (Hübner, 1809)
Uresiphita gilvata (Fabricius, 1794)

Elachistidae
Agonopterix adspersella (Kollar, 1832)
Agonopterix assimilella (Treitschke, 1832)
Agonopterix propinquella (Treitschke, 1835)
Agonopterix rutana (Fabricius, 1794)
Agonopterix subpropinquella (Stainton, 1849)
Agonopterix thapsiella (Zeller, 1847)
Agonopterix vendettella (Chretien, 1908)
Agonopterix yeatiana (Fabricius, 1781)
Depressaria depressana (Fabricius, 1775)
Depressaria marcella Rebel, 1901
Depressaria veneficella Zeller, 1847
Ethmia bipunctella (Fabricius, 1775)

Erebidae
Anumeta cestis (Menetries, 1848)
Anumeta hilgerti (Rothschild, 1909)
Araeopteron ecphaea Hampson, 1914
Autophila dilucida (Hübner, 1808)
Autophila rosea (Staudinger, 1888)
Autophila maura (Staudinger, 1888)
Casama innotata (Walker, 1855)
Catocala coniuncta (Esper, 1787)
Catocala elocata (Esper, 1787)
Catocala nymphaea (Esper, 1787)
Catocala nymphagoga (Esper, 1787)
Cerocala algiriae Oberthur, 1876
Clytie illunaris (Hübner, 1813)
Coscinia striata (Linnaeus, 1758)
Cymbalophora pudica (Esper, 1785)
Dysauxes famula (Freyer, 1836)
Dysgonia algira (Linnaeus, 1767)
Dysgonia torrida (Guenee, 1852)
Eilema caniola (Hübner, 1808)
Eilema pygmaeola (Doubleday, 1847)
Eublemma cochylioides (Guenee, 1852)
Eublemma deleta (Staudinger, 1901)
Eublemma deserta (Rothschild, 1909)
Eublemma ostrina (Hübner, 1808)
Eublemma parva (Hübner, 1808)
Eublemma scitula Rambur, 1833
Euproctis chrysorrhoea (Linnaeus, 1758)
Grammodes bifasciata (Petagna, 1787)
Grammodes stolida (Fabricius, 1775)
Heteropalpia acrosticta (Puneler, 1904)
Hypena lividalis (Hübner, 1796)
Hypena obsitalis (Hübner, 1813)
Hypena proboscidalis (Linnaeus, 1758)
Lithosia quadra (Linnaeus, 1758)
Lymantria atlantica (Rambur, 1837)
Metachrostis velocior (Staudinger, 1892)
Metachrostis velox (Hübner, 1813)
Minucia lunaris (Denis & Schiffermuller, 1775)
Nodaria nodosalis (Herrich-Schäffer, 1851)
Odice suava (Hübner, 1813)
Ophiusa tirhaca (Cramer, 1773)
Orgyia trigotephras Boisduval, 1829
Pandesma robusta (Walker, 1858)
Pechipogo plumigeralis Hübner, 1825
Phragmatobia fuliginosa (Linnaeus, 1758)
Schrankia costaestrigalis (Stephens, 1834)
Tathorhynchus exsiccata (Lederer, 1855)
Utetheisa pulchella (Linnaeus, 1758)
Zebeeba falsalis (Herrich-Schäffer, 1839)

Eriocottidae
Eriocottis fuscanella Zeller, 1847

Euteliidae
Eutelia adulatrix (Hübner, 1813)

Gelechiidae
Anarsia lineatella Zeller, 1839
Apodia bifractella (Duponchel, 1843)
Aproaerema anthyllidella (Hübner, 1813)
Aproaerema anthyllidella anthylidella (Hübner, 1813)
Crossobela trinotella (Herrich-Schäffer, 1856)
Dichomeris acuminatus (Staudinger, 1876)
Dichomeris lamprostoma (Zeller, 1847)
Ephysteris iberica Povolny, 1977
Ephysteris promptella (Staudinger, 1859)
Epidola melitensis Amsel, 1955
Eulamprotes nigritella (Zeller, 1847)
Isophrictis kefersteiniellus (Zeller, 1850)
Megacraspedus lativalvellus Amsel, 1954
Mesophleps ochracella (Turati, 1926)
Metzneria aestivella aestivella (Zeller, 1839)
Metzneria aestivella (Zeller, 1839)
Metzneria castiliella (Moschler, 1866)
Metzneria torosulella (Rebel, 1893)
Mirificarma eburnella (Denis & Schiffermuller, 1775)
Ochrodia subdiminutella (Stainton, 1867)
Ornativalva heluanensis (Debski, 1913)
Ornativalva plutelliformis (Staudinger, 1859)
Palumbina guerinii (Stainton, 1858)
Pectinophora gossypiella (Saunders, 1844)
Phthorimaea operculella (Zeller, 1873)
Platyedra subcinerea (Haworth, 1828)
Pseudotelphusa paripunctella (Thunberg, 1794)
Ptocheuusa paupella (Zeller, 1847)
Recurvaria nanella (Denis & Schiffermuller, 1775)
Scrobipalpa ergasima (Meyrick, 1916)
Scrobipalpa halymella (Milliere, 1864)
Scrobipalpa obsoletella (Fischer von Röslerstamm, 1841)
Scrobipalpa ocellatella (Boyd, 1858)
Scrobipalpa portosanctana (Stainton, 1859)
Scrobipalpa traganella (Chretien, 1915)
Scrobipalpa vicaria (Meyrick, 1921)
Sitotroga cerealella (Olivier, 1789)
Stomopteryx basalis (Staudinger, 1876)
Syncopacma polychromella (Rebel, 1902)
Tuta absoluta (Meyrick, 1917)

Geometridae
Aplocera efformata (Guenee, 1858)
Apochima flabellaria (Heeger, 1838)
Ascotis selenaria (Denis & Schiffermuller, 1775)
Aspitates ochrearia (Rossi, 1794)
Camptogramma bilineata (Linnaeus, 1758)
Catarhoe basochesiata (Duponchel, 1831)
Charissa mucidaria (Hübner, 1799)
Charissa variegata (Duponchel, 1830)
Chiasmia aestimaria (Hübner, 1809)
Coenotephria ablutaria (Boisduval, 1840)
Cyclophora puppillaria (Hübner, 1799)
Eucrostes indigenata (de Villers, 1789)
Eupithecia breviculata (Donzel, 1837)
Eupithecia centaureata (Denis & Schiffermuller, 1775)
Eupithecia innotata (Hufnagel, 1767)
Eupithecia oxycedrata (Rambur, 1833)
Eupithecia phoeniceata (Rambur, 1834)
Eupithecia semigraphata Bruand, 1850
Eupithecia ultimaria Boisduval, 1840
Eupithecia venosata (Fabricius, 1787)
Gymnoscelis rufifasciata (Haworth, 1809)
Horisme exoletata (Herrich-Schäffer, 1838)
Idaea degeneraria (Hübner, 1799)
Idaea determinata (Staudinger, 1876)
Idaea distinctaria (Boisduval, 1840)
Idaea elongaria (Rambur, 1833)
Idaea fractilineata (Zeller, 1847)
Idaea infirmaria (Rambur, 1833)
Idaea inquinata (Scopoli, 1763)
Idaea laevigata (Scopoli, 1763)
Idaea longaria (Herrich-Schäffer, 1852)
Idaea manicaria (Herrich-Schäffer, 1852)
Idaea obsoletaria (Rambur, 1833)
Idaea ochrata (Scopoli, 1763)
Idaea rainerii Hausmann, 1994
Idaea rusticata (Denis & Schiffermuller, 1775)
Idaea seriata (Schrank, 1802)
Isturgia arenacearia (Denis & Schiffermuller, 1775)
Isturgia disputaria (Guenee, 1858)
Isturgia spodiaria (Lefebvre, 1832)
Larentia clavaria (Haworth, 1809)
Larentia malvata (Rambur, 1833)
Lithostege fissurata Mabille, 1888
Menophra japygiaria (O. Costa, 1849)
Nycterosea obstipata (Fabricius, 1794)
Phaiogramma etruscaria (Zeller, 1849)
Phaiogramma faustinata (Milliere, 1868)
Rhodometra sacraria (Linnaeus, 1767)
Scopula asellaria (Herrich-Schäffer, 1847)
Scopula decolor (Staudinger, 1898)
Scopula emutaria (Hübner, 1809)
Scopula imitaria (Hübner, 1799)
Scopula marginepunctata (Goeze, 1781)
Scopula minorata (Boisduval, 1833)
Scopula ornata (Scopoli, 1763)
Scopula vigilata (Sohn-Rethel, 1929)
Scotopteryx chenopodiata (Linnaeus, 1758)
Thera cupressata (Geyer, 1831)
Xanthorhoe disjunctaria (de La Harpe, 1860)

Glyphipterigidae
Glyphipterix equitella (Scopoli, 1763)
Glyphipterix equitella equitella (Scopoli, 1763)
Glyphipterix simpliciella (Stephens, 1834)

Gracillariidae
Caloptilia coruscans (Walsingham, 1907)
Dialectica scalariella (Zeller, 1850)
Phyllocnistis citrella Stainton, 1856

Heliozelidae
Holocacista rivillei (Stainton, 1855)

Lasiocampidae
Gastropacha quercifolia (Linnaeus, 1758)
Gastropacha quercifolia quercifolia (Linnaeus, 1758)
Lasiocampa quercus (Linnaeus, 1758)
Lasiocampa quercus quercus (Linnaeus, 1758)
Lasiocampa trifolii (Denis & Schiffermuller, 1775)
Lasiocampa trifolii trifolii (Denis & Schiffermuller, 1775)
Malacosoma neustria (Linnaeus, 1758)
Malacosoma neustria neustria (Linnaeus, 1758)

Momphidae
Mompha subbistrigella (Haworth, 1828)

Nepticulidae
Stigmella aurella (Fabricius, 1775)

Noctuidae
Abrostola asclepiadis (Denis & Schiffermuller, 1775)
Abrostola triplasia (Linnaeus, 1758)
Acontia lucida (Hufnagel, 1766)
Acontia trabealis (Scopoli, 1763)
Aedia leucomelas (Linnaeus, 1758)
Aegle semicana (Esper, 1798)
Agrochola lychnidis (Denis & Schiffermuller, 1775)
Agrochola lychnidis lychnidis (Denis & Schiffermuller, 1775)
Agrotis catalaunensis (Milliere, 1873)
Agrotis catalaunensis catalaunensis (Milliere, 1873)
Agrotis haifae Staudinger, 1897
Agrotis herzogi Rebel, 1911
Agrotis ipsilon (Hufnagel, 1766)
Agrotis lasserrei (Oberthur, 1881)
Agrotis lata Treitschke, 1835
Agrotis puta (Hübner, 1803)
Agrotis segetum (Denis & Schiffermuller, 1775)
Agrotis spinifera (Hübner, 1808)
Agrotis trux (Hübner, 1824)
Amphipyra tragopoginis (Clerck, 1759)
Anarta deserticola (Hampson, 1905)
Anarta trifolii (Hufnagel, 1766)
Anarta sabulorum (Alpheraky, 1892)
Anarta sabulorum pulverata (A. Bang-Haas, 1907)
Aporophyla canescens (Duponchel, 1826)
Aporophyla chioleuca (Herrich-Schäffer, 1850)
Aporophyla chioleuca sammuti Fibiger, Yela, Zilli & Ronkay, 2010
Aporophyla nigra (Haworth, 1809)
Aporophyla nigra cinerea Staudinger, 1901
Athetis hospes (Freyer, 1831)
Autographa gamma (Linnaeus, 1758)
Brithys crini (Fabricius, 1775)
Bryophila raptricula (Denis & Schiffermuller, 1775)
Callopistria latreillei (Duponchel, 1827)
Calophasia platyptera (Esper, 1788)
Caradrina germainii (Duponchel, 1835)
Caradrina flava Oberthur, 1876
Caradrina vicina Staudinger, 1870
Caradrina vicina castrensis Berio, 1981
Caradrina clavipalpis Scopoli, 1763
Caradrina flavirena Guenee, 1852
Caradrina selini Boisduval, 1840
Caradrina selini djebli Rungs, 1972
Caradrina proxima Rambur, 1837
Cerastis faceta (Treitschke, 1835)
Chloantha hyperici (Denis & Schiffermuller, 1775)
Chrysodeixis chalcites (Esper, 1789)
Cleonymia chabordis (Oberthur, 1876)
Condica viscosa (Freyer, 1831)
Conisania luteago (Denis & Schiffermuller, 1775)
Conisania luteago luteago (Denis & Schiffermuller, 1775)
Cornutiplusia circumflexa (Linnaeus, 1767)
Cryphia algae (Fabricius, 1775)
Cryphia pallida (Baker, 1894)
Ctenoplusia accentifera (Lefebvre, 1827)
Cucullia biskrana Oberthur, 1918
Cucullia calendulae Treitschke, 1835
Cucullia chamomillae (Denis & Schiffermuller, 1775)
Cucullia syrtana Mabille, 1888
Cucullia lychnitis Rambur, 1833
Cucullia verbasci (Linnaeus, 1758)
Denticucullus pygmina (Haworth, 1809)
Diloba caeruleocephala (Linnaeus, 1758)
Dryobotodes tenebrosa (Esper, 1789)
Episema grueneri Boisduval, 1837
Eremohadena roseonitens (Oberthur, 1887)
Euxoa canariensis Rebel, 1902
Euxoa canariensis mauretanica (A. Bang-Haas, 1910)
Euxoa distinguenda (Lederer, 1857)
Gortyna xanthenes Germar, 1842
Hadena sancta (Staudinger, 1859)
Hadena sancta sancta (Staudinger, 1859)
Hadena capsincola (Denis & Schiffermuller, 1775)
Hecatera cappa (Hübner, 1809)
Hecatera weissi (Draudt, 1934)
Helicoverpa armigera (Hübner, 1808)
Heliothis nubigera Herrich-Schäffer, 1851
Heliothis peltigera (Denis & Schiffermuller, 1775)
Hoplodrina ambigua (Denis & Schiffermuller, 1775)
Lacanobia blenna (Hübner, 1824)
Lacanobia oleracea (Linnaeus, 1758)
Leucania loreyi (Duponchel, 1827)
Leucania punctosa (Treitschke, 1825)
Leucania putrescens (Hübner, 1824)
Leucania putrescens vallettai Boursin, 1952
Leucania zeae (Duponchel, 1827)
Luperina dumerilii (Duponchel, 1826)
Luperina dumerilii dumerilli (Duponchel, 1826)
Mamestra brassicae (Linnaeus, 1758)
Melanchra persicariae (Linnaeus, 1761)
Melanchra persicariae persicariae (Linnaeus, 1761)
Mniotype deluccai (Berio, 1976)
Mormo maura (Linnaeus, 1758)
Mythimna albipuncta (Denis & Schiffermuller, 1775)
Mythimna l-album (Linnaeus, 1767)
Mythimna languida (Walker, 1858)
Mythimna vitellina (Hübner, 1808)
Mythimna prominens (Walker, 1856)
Mythimna unipuncta (Haworth, 1809)
Mythimna sicula (Treitschke, 1835)
Noctua comes Hübner, 1813
Noctua janthe (Borkhausen, 1792)
Noctua pronuba (Linnaeus, 1758)
Noctua tirrenica Biebinger, Speidel & Hanigk, 1983
Nonagria typhae (Thunberg, 1784)
Nyctobrya muralis (Forster, 1771)
Nyctobrya segunai Fibiger, Steiner, & Ronkay, 2009
Ochropleura leucogaster (Freyer, 1831)
Oria musculosa (Hübner, 1808)
Peridroma saucia (Hübner, 1808)
Phlogophora meticulosa (Linnaeus, 1758)
Protoschinia scutosa (Denis & Schiffermuller, 1775)
Pseudozarba bipartita (Herrich-Schäffer, 1850)
Rhabinopteryx subtilis (Mabille, 1888)
Scythocentropus inquinata (Mabille, 1888)
Sesamia cretica Lederer, 1857
Sesamia nonagrioides Lefebvre, 1827
Spodoptera cilium Guenee, 1852
Spodoptera exigua (Hübner, 1808)
Spodoptera littoralis (Boisduval, 1833)
Synthymia fixa (Fabricius, 1787)
Thalpophila vitalba (Freyer, 1834)
Thysanoplusia circumscripta (Freyer, 1831)
Thysanoplusia daubei (Boisduval, 1840)
Thysanoplusia orichalcea (Fabricius, 1775)
Trichoplusia ni (Hübner, 1803)
Tyta luctuosa (Denis & Schiffermuller, 1775)
Valeria oleagina (Denis & Schiffermuller, 1775)
Xanthia ruticilla (Esper, 1791)
Xanthodes albago (Fabricius, 1794)
Xestia c-nigrum (Linnaeus, 1758)
Xestia xanthographa (Denis & Schiffermuller, 1775)
Xylena solidaginis (Hübner, 1803)
Xylena exsoleta (Linnaeus, 1758)
Xylena exsoleta exsoleta (Linnaeus, 1758)
Xylena exsoleta maltensis Fibiger, Sammut, Seguna & Catania, 2006

Nolidae
Earias clorana (Linnaeus, 1761)
Earias insulana (Boisduval, 1833)
Garella nilotica (Rogenhofer, 1882)
Nola cristatula (Hübner, 1793)

Oecophoridae
Batia lunaris (Haworth, 1828)
Epicallima formosella (Denis & Schiffermuller, 1775)
Esperia sulphurella (Fabricius, 1775)

Plutellidae
Plutella xylostella (Linnaeus, 1758)

Praydidae
Prays citri (Milliere, 1873)
Prays oleae (Bernard, 1788)

Psychidae
Apterona helicinella (Herrich-Schäffer, 1846)
Oiketicoides tedaldii (Heylaerts, 1881)
Pachythelia villosella (Ochsenheimer, 1810)
Penestoglossa dardoinella (Milliere, 1863)
Phalacropterix apiformis (Rossi, 1790)
Sciopetris melitensis Rebel, 1919

Pterolonchidae
Pterolonche pulverulenta Zeller, 1847
Pterolonche albescens Zeller, 1847
Pterolonche vallettae Amsel, 1955

Pterophoridae
Adaina microdactyla (Hübner, 1813)
Agdistis frankeniae (Zeller, 1847)
Agdistis melitensis Amsel, 1954
Agdistis meridionalis (Zeller, 1847)
Agdistis satanas Milliere, 1875
Agdistis symmetrica Amsel, 1955
Agdistis tamaricis (Zeller, 1847)
Amblyptilia acanthadactyla (Hübner, 1813)
Capperia hellenica Adamczewski, 1951
Crombrugghia laetus (Zeller, 1847)
Emmelina monodactyla (Linnaeus, 1758)
Hellinsia carphodactyla (Hübner, 1813)
Hellinsia inulae (Zeller, 1852)
Merrifieldia malacodactylus (Zeller, 1847)
Merrifieldia tridactyla (Linnaeus, 1758)
Porrittia galactodactyla (Denis & Schiffermuller, 1775)
Pterophorus ischnodactyla (Treitschke, 1835)
Puerphorus olbiadactylus (Milliere, 1859)
Stenoptilia bipunctidactyla (Scopoli, 1763)
Stenoptilia pterodactyla (Linnaeus, 1761)
Stenoptilia zophodactylus (Duponchel, 1840)
Stenoptilodes taprobanes (Felder & Rogenhofer, 1875)

Pyralidae
Achroia grisella (Fabricius, 1794)
Acrobasis obtusella (Hübner, 1796)
Aglossa caprealis (Hübner, 1809)
Aglossa pinguinalis (Linnaeus, 1758)
Alophia combustella (Herrich-Schäffer, 1855)
Ancylodes pallens Ragonot, 1887
Ancylosis convexella (Lederer, 1855)
Ancylosis faustinella (Zeller, 1867)
Ancylosis gracilella Ragonot, 1887
Ancylosis harmoniella (Ragonot, 1887)
Ancylosis nigripunctella (Staudinger, 1879)
Ancylosis oblitella (Zeller, 1848)
Ancylosis ochracea (Staudinger, 1870)
Ancylosis partitella (Ragonot, 1887)
Anerastia lotella (Hübner, 1813)
Apomyelois ceratoniae (Zeller, 1839)
Bostra obsoletalis (Mann, 1884)
Bradyrrhoa cantenerella (Duponchel, 1837)
Bradyrrhoa confiniella Zeller, 1848
Cadra abstersella (Zeller, 1847)
Cadra calidella (Guenee, 1845)
Cadra cautella (Walker, 1863)
Cadra figulilella (Gregson, 1871)
Cathayia insularum (Speidel & Schmitz, 1991)
Ceutholopha isidis (Zeller, 1867)
Corcyra cephalonica (Stainton, 1866)
Cryptoblabes gnidiella (Milliere, 1867)
Delplanqueia dilutella (Denis & Schiffermuller, 1775)
Denticera divisella (Duponchel, 1842)
Dioryctria mendacella (Staudinger, 1859)
Dioryctria pineae (Staudinger, 1859)
Dioryctria sylvestrella (Ratzeburg, 1840)
Ematheudes punctella (Treitschke, 1833)
Endotricha flammealis (Denis & Schiffermuller, 1775)
Ephestia elutella (Hübner, 1796)
Ephestia kuehniella Zeller, 1879
Ephestia unicolorella Staudinger, 1881
Ephestia unicolorella woodiella Richards & Thomson, 1932
Ephestia welseriella (Zeller, 1848)
Epischnia asteris Staudinger, 1870
Epischnia illotella Zeller, 1839
Etiella zinckenella (Treitschke, 1832)
Euzophera bigella (Zeller, 1848)
Euzophera lunulella (O. Costa, 1836)
Euzophera subcribrella Ragonot, 1887
Euzopherodes vapidella (Mann, 1857)
Faveria dionysia (Zeller, 1846)
Galleria mellonella (Linnaeus, 1758)
Gymnancyla canella (Denis & Schiffermuller, 1775)
Homoeosoma nimbella (Duponchel, 1837)
Homoeosoma sinuella (Fabricius, 1794)
Hypotia corticalis (Denis & Schiffermuller, 1775)
Hypotia infulalis Lederer, 1858
Hypotia pectinalis (Herrich-Schäffer, 1838)
Hypsopygia glaucinalis (Linnaeus, 1758)
Hypsotropa vulneratella (Zeller, 1847)
Khorassania compositella (Treitschke, 1835)
Lamoria anella (Denis & Schiffermuller, 1775)
Loryma egregialis (Herrich-Schäffer, 1838)
Maradana fuscolimbalis (Ragonot, 1888)
Metallostichodes nigrocyanella (Constant, 1865)
Moitrelia hispanella Staudinger, 1859
Moitrelia italogallicella (Milliere, 1882)
Myelois circumvoluta (Fourcroy, 1785)
Neurotomia coenulentella (Zeller, 1846)
Nyctegretis ruminella La Harpe, 1860
Oxybia transversella (Duponchel, 1836)
Pempelia brephiella (Staudinger, 1879)
Pempeliella sororiella Zeller, 1839
Phycita diaphana (Staudinger, 1870)
Phycita roborella (Denis & Schiffermuller, 1775)
Phycitodes binaevella (Hübner, 1813)
Phycitodes inquinatella (Ragonot, 1887)
Phycitodes lacteella (Rothschild, 1915)
Phycitodes saxicola (Vaughan, 1870)
Plodia interpunctella (Hübner, 1813)
Postemmalocera palaearctella (Turati, 1917)
Pterothrixidia rufella (Duponchel, 1836)
Pyralis farinalis (Linnaeus, 1758)
Stemmatophora brunnealis (Treitschke, 1829)
Synaphe punctalis (Fabricius, 1775)

Sesiidae
Bembecia tunetana (Le Cerf, 1920)
Chamaesphecia aerifrons (Zeller, 1847)
Chamaesphecia aerifrons aerifrons (Zeller, 1847)
Chamaesphecia anthraciformis (Rambur, 1832)
Synanthedon myopaeformis (Borkhausen, 1789)
Synanthedon myopaeformis cruentata (Mann, 1859)

Sphingidae
Acherontia atropos (Linnaeus, 1758)
Agrius convolvuli (Linnaeus, 1758)
Daphnis nerii (Linnaeus, 1758)
Hippotion celerio (Linnaeus, 1758)
Hyles livornica (Esper, 1780)
Hyles sammuti Eitschberger, Danner & Surholt, 1998
Macroglossum stellatarum (Linnaeus, 1758)

Stathmopodidae
Neomariania partinicensis (Rebel, 1937)

Tineidae
Ateliotum insulare (Rebel, 1896)
Ceratuncus danubiella (Mann, 1866)
Monopis obviella (Denis & Schiffermuller, 1775)
Praeacedes atomosella (Walker, 1863)
Reisserita mauretanica (Baker, 1885)
Rhodobates unicolor (Staudinger, 1870)
Trichophaga bipartitella (Ragonot, 1892)

Tischeriidae
Coptotriche angusticollella (Duponchel, 1843)

Tortricidae
Acleris variegana (Denis & Schiffermuller, 1775)
Acroclita subsequana (Herrich-Schäffer, 1851)
Aethes bilbaensis (Rossler, 1877)
Aethes deaurana (Peyerimhoff, 1877)
Aethes francillana (Fabricius, 1794)
Aphelia peramplana (Hübner, 1825)
Aphelia unitana (Hübner, [1796-99])
Archips rosana (Linnaeus, 1758)
Avaria hyerana (Milliere, 1858)
Bactra furfurana (Haworth, 1811)
Bactra lancealana (Hübner, 1799)
Bactra robustana (Christoph, 1872)
Bactra venosana (Zeller, 1847)
Cacoecimorpha pronubana (Hübner, 1799)
Clepsis consimilana (Hübner, 1817)
Clepsis neglectana (Herrich-Schäffer, 1851)
Clepsis spectrana (Treitschke, 1830)
Clepsis unicolorana (Duponchel, 1835)
Cnephasia bizensis Real, 1953
Cnephasia gueneeana (Duponchel, 1836)
Cnephasia longana (Haworth, 1811)
Cnephasia orientana (Alpheraky, 1876)
Cochylidia heydeniana (Herrich-Schäffer, 1851)
Cochylimorpha decolorella (Zeller, 1839)
Cochylimorpha straminea (Haworth, 1811)
Cochylis molliculana Zeller, 1847
Cochylis moguntiana (Rössler, 1864)
Crocidosema plebejana Zeller, 1847
Cydia fagiglandana (Zeller, 1841)
Cydia pomonella (Linnaeus, 1758)
Cydia sammuti Diakonoff, 1986
Cydia succedana (Denis & Schiffermuller, 1775)
Cydia ulicetana (Haworth, [1811])
Enarmonia formosana (Scopoli, 1763)
Endothenia marginana (Haworth, 1811)
Epinotia thapsiana (Zeller, 1847)
Eucosma cana (Haworth, 1811)
Eucosma fulvana (Stephens, 1834)
Fulvoclysia nerminae Koçak, 1982
Grapholita molesta (Busck, 1916)
Grapholita compositella (Fabricius, 1775)
Grapholita lunulana (Denis & Schiffermuller, 1775)
Gypsonoma dealbana (Frolich, 1828)
Hedya dimidiana (Clerck, 1759)
Lobesia botrana (Denis & Schiffermuller, 1775)
Lobesia indusiana (Zeller, 1847)
Lobesia limoniana (Millière, 1860)
Lobesia porrectana (Zeller, 1847)
Pammene fasciana (Linnaeus, 1761)
Pelochrista hepatariana (Herrich-Schäffer, 1851)
Pelochrista mollitana (Zeller, 1847)
Phalonidia contractana (Zeller, 1847)
Phtheochroa duponchelana (Duponchel, 1843)
Phtheochroa ochralana (Chretien, 1915)
Phtheochroa rectangulana (Chretien, 1915)
Pseudococcyx tessulatana (Staudinger, 1871)
Rhyacionia buoliana (Denis & Schiffermuller, 1775)
Selania capparidana (Zeller, 1847)
Selania leplastriana (Curtis, 1831)
Spilonota ocellana (Denis & Schiffermuller, 1775)

Yponomeutidae
Yponomeuta evonymella (Linnaeus, 1758)
Yponomeuta padella (Linnaeus, 1758)
Zelleria oleastrella (Milliere, 1864)

References

External links
Fauna Europaea

Malta
Malta
Malta
Moths
Lepidoptera